Pea Ridge is an extinct town in Washington County, in the U.S. state of Missouri. The GNIS classifies it as a populated place.

A post office called Pea Ridge was established in 1911, and remained in operation until 1932. The community was named after a nearby ridge of the same name, which in turn was derisively named from the notion the soil there was inadequate to support any crop other than peas.

References

Ghost towns in Missouri
Former populated places in Washington County, Missouri